William Casselman may refer to:

 William H. Casselman (1868–1941), Canadian politician
 William E. Casselman II (born 1941), American attorney,  Counsel to the President under Gerald Ford, 1974–1975
 Bill Casselman (William Allen Casselman, born 1941), American Canadian mathematician
 Bill Casselman (writer) (William Gordon Casselman, born 1942), Canadian writer and broadcaster